The 2018 Youngstown State Penguins football team represented Youngstown State University in the 2018 NCAA Division I FCS football season. They were led by third-year head coach Bo Pelini and played their home games at Stambaugh Stadium. They were a member of the Missouri Valley Football Conference. They finished the season 4–7, 3–5 in MVFC play to finish in a three-way tie for sixth place.

Previous season
The Penguins finished the 2017 season 6–5, 4–4 in MVFC play to finish in a three-way tie for fifth place.

Preseason

Award watch lists

Preseason MVFC poll
The MVFC released their preseason poll on July 29, 2018, with the Penguins predicted to finish in fourth place.

Preseason All-MVFC Teams
The Penguins placed six players on the preseason all-MVFC teams.

Offense

1st team

Tevin McCaster – RB

Vitas Hrynkiewicz – OL

Gavin Wiggins – OL

Steven Wethli – LS

Defense

1st team

Armand Dellovade – LB

2nd team

Bryce Gibson – DB

Schedule

Source: Schedule

Game summaries

Butler

at West Virginia

Valparaiso

at Western Illinois

Southern Illinois

at South Dakota State

South Dakota

Indiana State

at North Dakota State

Northern Iowa

at Illinois State

Ranking movements

References

Youngstown State
Youngstown State Penguins football seasons
Youngstown State Penguins football